The 1999 Pan American Games, officially known as the XIII Pan American Games, were a continental multi-sport event held in Winnipeg, Canada, from July 23 to August 8, 1999. At the Games, 5,000 athletes selected from 42 National Olympic Committees (NOCs) participated in events in 38 sports. Twenty-seven nations earned medals during the competition, and eighteen won at least one gold medal.

Medal table 

The ranking in this table is based on medal counts published by several media organizations. By default, the table is ordered by the number of gold medals won by the athletes representing a nation. (In this context, a nation is an entity represented by a NOC). The number of silver medals is taken into consideration next and then the number of bronze medals. If nations are still tied, equal ranking is given and they are listed alphabetically by IOC country code.

To sort this table by nation, total medal count, or any other column, click on the  icon next to the column title.

Notes 

  Some sources appoint that the United States earned 110 silver medals and 80 bronze medals, instead of 119 and 79, respectively. This would result in a total of 296 medals, instead of 304.
  Some sources appoint that Cuba earned 69 gold medals and 39 silver medals, instead of 70 and 40, respectively. This would result in a total of 155 medals, instead of 157.
  Therefore, according to some sources, 328 gold medals, 327 silver medals and 393 bronze medals were awarded during the Games, instead of 329, 337 and 392, respectively. This would result in a total number of 1,048 medals awarded, instead of 1,058.

References 

General

 

Specific

See also 

Medal table
Pan American Games medal tables